The Suzuki GSX650F is a sport touring motorcycle made by Suzuki. It is essentially an updated Bandit, filling the void of the retired Katana. The 656 cc liquid-cooled engine has  and a 12,500 rpm redline. The transmission is 6-speed with a chain drive.  Anti-lock brakes were added as standard equipment in 2009 for Canada. 

Since its introduction there have been two recalls for the US 2008 model for electrical issues that cause stalling while riding and improper battery charging .

Australasian LAMS variant 

In Australia and New Zealand, the Suzuki GSX650 is available in an "FU" and "F" silver engine models to comply with the LAMS (Learner Approved Motorcycle Scheme) requirements. This is achieved by shipping a modified ECM (Engine Control Module) that has most of the upper band of available engine revs mapped to lower power output.

The model typically is identifiable by the graphic on the fairings blending less abruptly than the F counterpart, i.e.; the blue and white default colour scheme are feathered together to give seamlessness whereas the F model fairings are deliberately sharp lines achieving a sportier look.

References

External links

Suzuki GSX650F official website

Suzuki Canada GSX650F

GSX650F
Motorcycles introduced in 2008